The 2015 season is Sandefjord Fotball's 18th season, and their first Tippeligaen season since their relegation in 2010. It is their 2nd season with Lars Bohinen as manager, during which they will compete in the Norwegian Cup as well as the Tippeligaen.

Squad

Out on loan

Transfers

Winter

In:

Out:

Summer

In:

Out:

Competitions

Tippeligaen

Results summary

Results by round

Results

Table

Norwegian Cup

Squad statistics

Appearances and goals

|-
|colspan="14"|Players away from Sandefjord on loan:

|-
|colspan="14"|Players who appeared for Sandefjord no longer at the club:

|}

Goal scorers

Disciplinary record

References

Sandefjord Fotball seasons
Sandefjord